Andre Agassi was the defending champion, and won in the final 6–3, 3–6, 6–3, against Yevgeny Kafelnikov.

Players

Draw

Main draw

Play-offs

External links
Official Colonial Classic website
2001 Colonial Classic results

Kooyong Classic
Col